This was a new event in 2013. Alla Kudryavtseva and Elina Svitolina won the title, defeating Corinna Dentoni and Aliaksandra Sasnovich in the final, 6–1, 6–3

Seeds

Draw

References 
 Draw

Vanessa Phillips Women's Tournament - Doubles